King is an unincorporated community in Patoka Township, Gibson County, Indiana, United States. It is also referred to as Kings or as King's Station.

History
King had its start in the early 1850s when the Evansville & Terre Haute Railroad was extended to that point. It was named for John King, a pioneer settler.

A post office was established at King in 1882, and remained in operation until it was discontinued in 1908.

Geography

References

Unincorporated communities in Gibson County, Indiana
Unincorporated communities in Indiana